John Weisenberger is a Guamanian politician and former attorney general of Guam from 2010 to 2011. He was also the public guardian of Guam.

Education 
John graduated from Wayne State University in Detroit, Michigan in 1970. He earned a bachelors degree in accounting. In 1974, he earned his Juris Doctor degree from the same university. He began practicing law in Michigan in 1974, and then in Guam in 1977.

Career
In January of 2001, John Weisenberger was appointed by the Supreme Court of Guam to become the first public guardian of Guam. He served as the public guardian from 2001 to 2008.

Attorney general 
He was appointed as the attorney general on June 21, 2010 to replace Alicia Limtiaco, who departed to become Guam's United States Attorney. He was replaced in January 2011 by Leonardo Rapadas, who was elected in November 2010.

Retirement 
John announced his retirement on December 12th, 2014. He was presented with the Ancient Order of the Chamorro by Governor Eddie Calvo shortly after the announcement.

Personal life 
John is married to Elizabeth Mandell and they have four children.

He is a Christian.

References

External links
Official site

Living people
Year of birth missing (living people)
Guamanian lawyers
American lawyers
Attorneys General of Guam